Skåne or Skane can refer to:

Places
 Skåne, the southernmost of the 25 traditional non-administrative provinces of Sweden, in English usually referred to as Scania
 Skåne County, also called Scania County, in Swedish Skåne län, the southernmost of the 21 administrative counties of Sweden
 Scania Regional Council, in Swedish Region Skåne, the regional entity responsible for e.g. health care and public transport in Skåne County
 Skane Township, Kittson County, Minnesota, USA
 Skåneland, a historical region of Sweden and Denmark.

People
 Duke of Skåne
 Duchess of Skåne

Other uses
 Skåne Akvavit, a Swedish brand for akvavit
 Skåne University Hospital, in Sweden
 M/S Skåne, a ship operated by Scandlines.

See also
 Skanes (surname)
 Scania (disambiguation)